Apogon maculatus, commonly known as flamefish, is a species of cardinalfish from the western Atlantic. Apogon maculatus is a nocturnal fish, and it usually hides in shadowy areas. This fish can be viewed with a red light in a dark room if needed to. It occasionally makes its way into the aquarium trade because of its uniqueness. In captivity the fish's color tends to fade unless fed color enhancing vitamins. This fish can be aggressive towards other cardinalfish. Otherwise it does well with peaceful tank mates as long as it has caves and places to hide.

References

External links
 AquariumsLife The aquarium database
 
Bluezooaquatics Bluezooaquatics Apogon maculatus info page
Animal Planet Animal Planet Apogon maculatus info page
reef2reef reef2reef fish of the day Apogon maculatus info
 

maculatus
Fish of the Eastern United States
Fish of the Caribbean
Fish of the Dominican Republic
Taxa named by Felipe Poey
Fish described in 1860
Fish of Cuba